Cossula coerulescens is a moth in the family Cossidae. It is found in Costa Rica and Panama..<ref>, 2021, ''photo of specimen collected at Finca Hartmann, Chiriqui Province, Panama, in March 2007.

References

Natural History Museum Lepidoptera generic names catalog

Cossulinae
Moths described in 1911